Divorce Bill may refer to:

 An unsuccessful 1837 bill in the U.S. Congress which prefigured the Independent Treasury
 Local and personal Acts of Parliament (United Kingdom) or its predecessors, to grant a divorce
 Brexit divorce bill, a sum of money due to the European Union by the United Kingdom in connection with Brexit

See also
 Divorce Act (disambiguation)
 A Bill of Divorcement (disambiguation)